Domoxin (INN) is a hydrazine derivative monoamine oxidase inhibitor (MAOI) antidepressant which was never marketed.

See also 
 Monoamine oxidase inhibitor
 Hydrazine (antidepressant)

References 

Antidepressants
Benzodioxans
Hydrazines
Monoamine oxidase inhibitors